"" is the 10th single by Zard and released 3 November 1993 under B-Gram Records label. It was released two months after previous single "Mō Sukoshi, Ato Sukoshi...". The single debuted at #1 rank first week. It charted for 15 weeks and sold over 872,000 copies.

Track list
All songs are written by Izumi Sakai and arranged by Masao Akashi

composer: Tetsurō Oda
single and album version have different arrangements.
the song was used in Fuji TV drama Shiratori Reiko de Gozaimasu! as theme song

composer: Seiichiro Kuribayashi
 (original karaoke)
 (original karaoke)

References

1993 singles
Zard songs
Songs written by Izumi Sakai
Songs written by Tetsurō Oda
Oricon Weekly number-one singles
Japanese television drama theme songs
1993 songs